Bloomington is a unincorporated community in San Bernardino County, California, United States. The population was 23,851 at the 2010 census, up from 19,318 at the 2000 census.  For statistical purposes, the United States Census Bureau has defined   Bloomington as a census-designated place (CDP).

Though currently unincorporated, many of the town's political activists are pushing for Bloomington to attain cityhood, while the nearby cities of Rialto and Fontana are attempting to annex the community. The incorporation effort is led by the Bloomington Incorporation Committee.

History
Bloomington was originally developed as part of the land holdings of the Semi-Tropic Land and Water Company, which was formed in 1887.

In 1907, the Riverside Portland Cement Company built a large plant near the Crestmore Quarries (South Bloomington), and to provide transportation for employees built a standard gauge railroad to Riverside. On May 20, 1911 the line was opened to Bloomington. The original community, known as Crestmore, is generally located between Locust Avenue and Larch Avenue, south of Jurupa Avenue, extending to the Riverside County line. The Pacific Electric Crestmore Line (Riverside–Rialto) provided local service for many years.

The Semi-Tropic Land and Water Company (now known as West Valley Water District) laid out the town sites of Bloomington, Rialto, Fontana, and Sansevaine. The town site for Bloomington, after being surveyed in April, 1888, was bounded on the north by Valley Boulevard, on the south by Slover Avenue, on the east by Larch Avenue, and on the west by Linden Avenue.

Part of the community is still rural and many residents continue to keep and raise animals. The cities of Rialto and Colton are both trying to annex much of the land now within Bloomington.

Incorporation attempts
In 1989, full incorporation was not completed due to budget and staff constraints.

In 2007, the Bloomington Incorporation Committee (BIC) applied with the Local Agency Formation Commission for another attempt for incorporation. It failed in late February and early March, when the Local Agency Formation Commission denied an extension that BIC needed in order to pay a $109,000 deposit for feasibility and financial studies.

Geography

Demographics

2000
At the 2000 census there were 19,318 people, 4,950 households, and 4,128 families in the CDP. The population density was 3,236.8 inhabitants per square mile (1,249.4/km). The racial makeup of the CDP was 54.3% White, 4.0% African American, 1.8% Native American, 1.1% Asian, 0.2% Pacific Islander, 34.5% from other races, and 4.3% from two or more races. Hispanic or Latino of any race were 64.4%.

Of the 4,950 households 50.1% had children under the age of 18 living with them, 59.8% were married couples living together, 16.2% had a female householder with no husband present, and 16.6% were non-families. 12.8% of households were one person and 5.7% were one person aged 65 or older. The average household size was 3.9 and the average family size was 4.2.

The age distribution was 36.4% under the age of 18, 10.5% from 18 to 24, 29.5% from 25 to 44, 16.1% from 45 to 64, and 7.5% 65 or older. The median age was 27 years. For every 100 females, there were 100.2 males. For every 100 females age 18 and over, there were 97.7 males.

The median household income was $34,106 and the median family income  was $35,936. Males had a median income of $30,680 versus $20,606 for females. The per capita income for the CDP was $10,953. About 19.8% of families and 25.3% of the population were below the poverty line, including 30.5% of those under age 18 and 10.8% of those age 65 or over. Bloomington has a large Nazarene church and Christian Elementary School and Preschool.

2010
At the 2010 census Bloomington had a population of 23,851. The racial makeup of Bloomington was 12,988 (54.5%) White (14.1% Non-Hispanic White), 649 (2.7%) African American, 309 (1.3%) Native American, 330 (1.4%) Asian, 47 (0.2%) Pacific Islander, 8,600 (36.1%) from other races, and 928 (3.9%) from two or more races. Hispanic or Latino of any race were 19,326 persons (81.0%).

The census reported that 23,670 people (99.2% of the population) lived in households, 154 (0.6%) lived in non-institutionalized group quarters, and 27 (0.1%) were institutionalized.

There were 5,428 households, 3,310 (61.0%) had children under the age of 18 living in them, 3,238 (59.7%) were opposite-sex married couples living together, 895 (16.5%) had a female householder with no husband present, 561 (10.3%) had a male householder with no wife present.  There were 449 (8.3%) unmarried opposite-sex partnerships, and 38 (0.7%) same-sex married couples or partnerships. 518 households (9.5%) were one person and 214 (3.9%) had someone living alone who was 65 or older. The average household size was 4.36. There were 4,694 families (86.5% of households); the average family size was 4.52.

The age distribution was 8,013 people (33.6%) under the age of 18, 3,019 people (12.7%) aged 18 to 24, 6,493 people (27.2%) aged 25 to 44, 4,761 people (20.0%) aged 45 to 64, and 1,565 people (6.6%) who were 65 or older. The median age was 27.8 years. For every 100 females, there were 103.3 males.  For every 100 females age 18 and over, there were 101.7 males.

There were 5,745 housing units at an average density of 959.6 per square mile, of the occupied units 3,740 (68.9%) were owner-occupied and 1,688 (31.1%) were rented. The homeowner vacancy rate was 2.6%; the rental vacancy rate was 5.1%. 16,181 people (67.8% of the population) lived in owner-occupied housing units and 7,489 people (31.4%) lived in rental housing units.

According to the 2010 United States Census, Bloomington had a median household income of $46,639, with 22.2% of the population living below the federal poverty line.

Public safety
Bloomington has been patrolled by the California Highway Patrol and the San Bernardino County Sheriff Department's Fontana Station since 1941.

Bloomington's fire department service is provided by the San Bernardino County Fire Department.

Transportation
The town of Bloomington is served by Omnitrans bus service. The city is also served by Interstate 10 (San Bernardino Freeway).

Education
Bloomington is within the Colton Joint Unified School District.

Government

Parks within Bloomington are managed by the Bloomington Recreation and Park District.

Climate
The climate in Bloomington tends to be stable year round:

References

External links
Bloomington's attempts at Cityhood

Census-designated places in San Bernardino County, California
Populated places established in 1888
Census-designated places in California